Cold Springs High School is a public high school in Bremen, Alabama, United States. They educate grades 9-12.

References

External links
 

Public high schools in Alabama
Educational institutions established in 1937
Schools in Cullman County, Alabama
Public middle schools in Alabama
1937 establishments in Alabama